Sanin is a novel by the Russian writer Mikhail Artsybashev. It has an interesting history being written in 1907 – at the peak of the various changes in Russian society (democratic activities, first democratically elected Duma in 1906, as well as the Russian Revolution of 1905). It was published and criticized in 1907, the year of one of the most horrific political reactions in Russian history. In the early 1900s Russia society was heavily influenced by religions, primarily the Russian Orthodox Church. Though there were many other religions such as Catholics, Judaism, and Muslims, none of them condoned an open expression of sexuality. By 1908 the novel was no longer being produced due to censorship. It was banned as a "work of pornography" (Otto Boele). When Artsybashev emigrated to Poland after the Russian Revolution of 1917, he was condemned by the Soviet authorities and his books were banned from publication, only to be revealed afresh to readers in the 1990s.

Sanin is a novel of true originality of form and content. Its hero, twenty-something Sanin, after a long absence from home, comes back to visit his mother and sister. Sanin deals with sex and sexual activity throughout the novel. The main character Sanin and his sister Lida dabble in premarital sex. Lida describes her experience with Zarudin as her body filled with "thrilled and shaken with passion". Knowing it is not the best thing for a young lady not to be married and have relations, she's longing for another chance to experience that same passion and lust. The novel deals with nihilism, the belief that traditional morals, ideas, beliefs, etc., have no worth or value. One of the characters gets to a point where he admits "that life was the realization of freedom, and consequently that it was natural for a man to live for enjoyment". Lida has some remorse because of society and their views on premarital sex, but then comes to the realization that it is her life saying "I wanted to do it and I did it; and I felt so happy". During his stay Sanin meets various people, some of whom are neutral, amazed, threatened or excited by his way of thinking about the world and human existence. Sanin remains confident and self-assured having seduced and deflowered a local virgin, but at the end of the book leaves town under a cloud.

Colin Wilson wrote about Sanin:

"The book's hero sneers at the unhealthy moral preoccupations of most Russians, and preaches a doctrine of sunlight and frank sensuality. The book had an enormous impact on Russian youth, who were eager to put its doctrines into practice. Probably no book in world literature has been responsible for the loss of so many maidenheads."

Wilson added that Sanin deserves more study in English.

Although "Sanin" focuses much of its attention on sex and sexuality of youth, the novel puts forth several strikingly feminist ideals other than sexual freedom of women. For example, near the start of the novel, Sanin states his opinion that women should be allowed to have careers, a direct opposition to the traditional belief that women should be nothing more than mothers or housekeepers. Later on, after discovering that his sister, Lida, is pregnant while unmarried, he urges her to get an abortion, yet still respects her decision not to, something very uncommon for this time period.

The novelty of Sanin lies in its insertion of progressive and liberal thoughts and ideals in the literary form of a novel. Critics in 1907 and later in the Russian SFSR were furious to find such views as Sanin's in existence. They put their efforts to discrediting the book, whose references to the Bible, Shakespeare, Dickens, Dostoevsky, Nietzsche and whose precipitation of the dramatic changes in the morality and political life of the following decades were, in their view, dangerous for the Russian people.

Literature 

 Sanin write by Mikhail Petrovich Artsybashev and translated by Percy Edward Pinkerton in 1910
 Otto Boele: Erotic nihilism in late imperial Russia the case of Mikhail Artsybashev's Sanin. Madison: University of Wisconsin Press, 2009
 Angelika Hechtl: Sanin $ells! Zur Rezeption von Michail Arcybaševs Roman „Sanin“. University of Vienna, 2013 (PDF)

External links
 
  (Translated by Percy E. Pinkerton)
Information about Sanin

References 

1908 Russian novels